Kelly Kamalelehua Smith (October 13, 1962 – July 12, 2020), known professionally as Kelly Preston, was an American actress. She appeared in more than 60 television and film productions, including Mischief (1985), Twins (1988), Jerry Maguire (1996), and For Love of the Game (1999). She married John Travolta in 1991, and collaborated with him on the comedy film The Experts (1989) and the biographical film Gotti (2018). She also starred in the films SpaceCamp (1986), The Cat in the Hat (2003), What a Girl Wants (2003), Sky High (2005), and Old Dogs (2009).

Early years
Kelly Kamalelehua Smith (the middle name "Kamalelehua" means "garden of lehuas" in Hawaiian) was born in Honolulu, Hawaii. Her mother, Linda, was an administrator of a mental health center. Her father, who worked for an agricultural firm, drowned when she was three years old. Her mother subsequently married Peter Palzis, a personnel director. He adopted her, and she used his name at the start of her acting career. She also had a younger half-brother, Chris Palzis.

As a child, she lived in Iraq, and also Australia, where she attended Pembroke School, Adelaide. She then attended Punahou School in Honolulu, graduating in 1980, and studied drama and theater at the University of Southern California.

Career
While living in Australia, she was discovered at age 16 by a fashion photographer who helped her get work in commercials and other small parts. He arranged her first film audition for the role of Emmeline in The Blue Lagoon (1980), which she lost to the younger Brooke Shields. At that time she changed her last name to Preston.

Her first prominent film roles came in 1985—first as Marilyn McCauley in the romantic teen flick comedy Mischief; then as the beautiful but shallow Deborah Ann Fimple in another teen romantic comedy, Secret Admirer.  Her other roles included SpaceCamp (1986), Twins (1988) with Arnold Schwarzenegger and Danny DeVito, Avery Bishop in Jerry Maguire (1996) with Tom Cruise, Jane Aubrey in For Love of the Game with Kevin Costner and Kate Newell, and in Holy Man (1998) with Eddie Murphy and Jeff Goldblum. In 1997, she starred in Nothing to Lose, which co-starred Tim Robbins and Martin Lawrence. She also starred in the movie Jack Frost (1998).

She played the girlfriend of her husband John Travolta's character Terl in the film Battlefield Earth, for which she received "Worst Supporting Actress" at the 21st Golden Raspberry Awards. She appeared as the protagonist's flying, superhero mother in the film Sky High (2005).

In 2004, she was in the Maroon 5 music video "She Will Be Loved", which featured a love triangle and romantic scenes between her and Maroon 5 front man Adam Levine. She appeared in the crime thriller Death Sentence (2007), in which she played Helen Hume, the wife of Kevin Bacon's character Nick. In 2008, she was cast in a television pilot called Suburban Shootout, and had a short term recurring role in Medium.

She starred in the Lifetime television film The Tenth Circle (2008), directed by Peter Markle. It was shot in Nova Scotia and featured Ron Eldard, Britt Robertson, Michael Riley, Jamie Johnston and Geordie Brown.

She was a spokeswoman for Neutrogena, appearing in its print and television ads.

Her final red carpet appearance came at the New York City premiere of her husband's motion picture Gotti in 2018.

Her final film role was in the comedy-drama Off the Rails, which was released in late July 2021 in the UK.

Personal life
Preston was married to actor Kevin Gage from 1985 until their divorce in 1987. She also had a relationship with George Clooney in the late 1980s. She was briefly engaged to Charlie Sheen in 1990, but ended the relationship shortly after he allegedly shot her in the arm. In a 2011 interview with TMZ, Preston said that Sheen did not shoot her.

Preston met John Travolta in 1987 while filming The Experts. They married in 1991, traveling to Paris on an Air France Concorde for a wedding ceremony at the Hotel de Crillon (on the Place de la Concorde) on September 5, 1991. However, a second ceremony was required because the first, performed by a French Scientology minister (both Preston and Travolta were Scientologists), was considered invalid. The second ceremony took place on September 12 in Daytona Beach, Florida. Preston and Travolta had three children: son Jett, daughter Ella Bleu, and a second son, Benjamin. Preston remained a Scientologist until her death.

Death of Jett Travolta
Preston's son Jett Travolta was described as suffering from Kawasaki disease as an infant and had a history of seizures. In 2003, Preston appeared on The Montel Williams Show to promote L. Ron Hubbard's Purification Rundown, which she credited with helping her son.

On January 2, 2009, Jett Travolta died while the family was vacationing in the Bahamas. His death was attributed to a seizure. In September 2009, Travolta and Preston confirmed longstanding speculations when they testified that their son had autism and suffered regular seizures. This transpired during their testimony at the trial resulting from an extortion attempt related to their son's death.

On January 23, 2009, three people were arrested in the Bahamas in connection with a multimillion-dollar extortion plot against Travolta and Preston concerning the circumstances of their son's death. One of the men, Obie Wilchcombe, a member of the Bahamian Parliament and former Bahamian Minister of Tourism, was described as a "close friend" of Travolta and Preston. Two others allegedly involved were an EMT named Tarino Lightbourne and a Bahamian senator named Pleasant Bridgewater. Bridgewater was charged with abetment to extort and conspiracy to extort and resigned from the Senate as a result of the allegations. The first trial ended in a mistrial. After a second jury had been selected, the Travoltas elected to drop the case and all charges against the defendants were dismissed.

Death
On July 12, 2020, Preston died at the age of 57 at her home in Clearwater, Florida, two years after she had been diagnosed with breast cancer. Her diagnosis was not widely publicized. Preston had been receiving treatment at the MD Anderson Cancer Center in Houston; she had also been treated at other medical centers. Her death was announced in an Instagram post under an account belonging to John Travolta and Ella Bleu.

Filmography

Film

Television

Web

Music videos

Awards and nominations

References

External links

 
 
 
 

1962 births
2020 deaths
20th-century American actresses
21st-century American actresses
Actresses from Honolulu
American adoptees
American expatriates in Australia
American female models
American film actresses
American Scientologists
American television actresses
Deaths from breast cancer
Deaths from cancer in Florida
People educated at Pembroke School, Adelaide
People from Islesboro, Maine
Punahou School alumni
Travolta family
USC School of Dramatic Arts alumni